Ronald Howard Lewis (16 July 1909 – 18 June 1990) was a Labour Party politician in the United Kingdom.

Lewis studied at Cliff Methodist College and became a Methodist local preacher. He served in the Middle East with the Royal Army Service Corps during World War II. He worked in the shops section of British Railways and served as a councillor on Derbyshire County Council from 1949 and on Blackwell Rural District Council from 1950.

Lewis contested Rugby in 1945, Crosby in 1950, West Derbyshire in 1951, Northamptonshire South in 1955 and Darlington in 1959. He was Member of Parliament for Carlisle from 1964 until he retired in 1987.  In 1983, Carlisle was the most marginal Labour seat in the country - with Lewis finishing just 71 votes ahead of the Conservative candidate.

His successor was Eric Martlew.

References
The Times Guide to the House of Commons, Times Newspapers Ltd, 1950, 1955, 1966 & 1983

External links 
 

1909 births
1990 deaths
Labour Party (UK) MPs for English constituencies
National Union of Railwaymen-sponsored MPs
Members of the Parliament of the United Kingdom for Carlisle
UK MPs 1964–1966
UK MPs 1966–1970
UK MPs 1970–1974
UK MPs 1974
UK MPs 1974–1979
UK MPs 1979–1983
UK MPs 1983–1987
Councillors in Derbyshire
British Army personnel of World War II
Royal Army Service Corps soldiers